Israel Yeivin  (Hebrew: ישראל ייבין) (born January 7, 1923 in Berlin – died December 19, 2008) was an Israeli linguist, scholar of Masorah and the Hebrew language.

Biography
Israel Yeivin was born in Berlin. His family immigrated to Palestine when he was seven, and he grew up in Tel Aviv. His father, Yehoshua Yeivin, was a conceptual philosopher of the Revisionist Zionism movement and founder of the radical Zionist group Brit HaBirionim. His mother was Miryam Atara Margolin. As a child, he attended Ahad Ha'Am School and graduated from Gymnasia Balfour in 1940. Soon after, he began to study Hebrew Language & Literature and Philosophy at the Hebrew University of Jerusalem. He received his M.A degree in 1958. His thesis dealt with "Hakafat HaTevot HaZeirot BaMikra (21 Sfarim)".

In 1958, he married Batya Heifetz, with whom he had two sons.

In 1968 he received his doctorate for his research on "Babylonian point vocalization". While studying at the University, he worked at a printing shop as a typesetter and proofreader. Then he became a proofreader on the editorial staff of the Hebrew Encyclopedia. He worked on the preparatory stage of the Encyclopedia Judaica and became Editorial Secretary of the "Tarbitz" quarterly. Working on the Bible Project of the Hebrew University, he became expert in deciphering ancient manuscripts of the Bible, including "The Aleppo Codex", on which he published a book.

Academic and linguistics career
In 1959, Yeivin joined the  Academy of the Hebrew Language's project to publish a historic dictionary of the Hebrew language. He worked on the Dictionary's editorial board for more than 30 years as Head of Ancient Hebrew research. From 1968, he taught at the Hebrew University Language Department, becoming a professor and head of the Hebrew Language Department. He retired in 1990 but continued to research the Masorah; Bible accentuation (Ta'amei HaMikra), the traditional language revealed in the Babylonian Vocalization, Rabbinical Hebrew, Leshon Hachamim), liturgical poetry (Piyyut), and lexicology. He published 3 books and more than 50 research papers.

In 1975, Yeivin spent several months at Cambridge, England helping to unravel and classify documents from the Cairo Genizah. Ezra Fleischer and Jacob Sussmann shared in this work with Yeivin.

Awards and recognition
In 1986, Yeivin was awarded the Friedenberg Prize for his book "The Hebrew Language Tradition as Reflected in the Babylonian Vocalization".

In 1989, he was awarded the Israel Prize, for the study of the Hebrew language. Among the reasons for their decision, the judges stated that "…he is one of the greatest world authorities in the study of the Masorah and Accentuation (Teamim) and the greatest scholar of the Hebrew Masorah in Babylonian Vocalization."

Yeivin was a member of the Academy of the Hebrew Language from 1987 and member of the Israel Academy of Sciences since 1991. He transferred his private collection of micro-films of vocalizations, including parts of hidden archives of Genizah, in vocalization and accentuation to the Institute of Microfilmed Hebrew Manuscripts of the National Library in Jerusalem in memory of his son Dov, who died in 1986. Further in memory of his son Dov, a large part of his rare scholarly collection has been donated to the Ariel University Center of Samaria Library.

Selected works
The Aleppo Codex of the Bible: a study of its vocalization and accentuation, 1968
The Hebrew Language Tradition as Reflected in the Babylonian Vocalization, 1985
The Biblical Masorah, 2003
 Introduction to the Tiberian Masorah, 1980

See also
List of Israel Prize recipients

References

 Reuven Mirkin, "Baal Hayovel", in Researches in Language E-H, Book Israel Yeivin. Jerusalem 1992

Linguists from Israel
1923 births
2008 deaths
Israel Prize in study of the Hebrew language recipients
Members of the Israel Academy of Sciences and Humanities
20th-century linguists
German emigrants to Mandatory Palestine